The Royal River is a small river,  long, in southern Maine.  The river originates in Sabbathday Lake in New Gloucester and flows northeasterly into Auburn and then southerly through New Gloucester (via the Royal River Reservoir), Gray and North Yarmouth into Casco Bay at Yarmouth. 

The river is bridged by Interstate 95 and U.S. Route 202 before leaving New Gloucester, then by the Maine Central Railroad "Back Road" and the Grand Trunk Railway in Auburn, and then again by the Grand Trunk Railway and by State Route 231 when it returns to New Gloucester.  The river is bridged twice more by the Maine Central Back Road in Gray.  In North Yarmouth, the river is bridged again by State Route 231 and by State Route 9, and in Yarmouth it is crossed by the Maine Central Railroad "Lower Road", again by the Grand Trunk Railway, by U.S. Route 1 and, at its mouth, by State Route 88 (carried by the East Main Street Bridge) and, finally, Interstate 295.

The Native Americans called the river Westcustogo River (meaning muddy) or Pumgustuck River (falls at mouth of river).

During the 1700s and 1800s, Yarmouth River, as it was then known, was a source of great economic growth for Yarmouth as it provided the power for the many mills. One such mill was erected in 1872 by the Forest Paper Company on the current site of the Royal River Park.

The river is mentioned in several of Maine-native Stephen King's novels, including The Body, when the boys cross the Royal River, only to be attacked by leeches, as well as 'Salem's Lot and Rita Hayworth and Shawshank Redemption. The McKin Company Superfund site was within the Royal River watershed.

William Royall

The river is named for William Royall (–1676), one of the first European settlers in the area, though the official form of its name omits the second L.

Gallery

See also
List of rivers in Maine

References

New Gloucester, Maine
Rivers of Cumberland County, Maine
Auburn, Maine
Gray, Maine
North Yarmouth, Maine
Landforms of Yarmouth, Maine
Rivers of Maine
Transportation in Yarmouth, Maine